Lev L. Dassin (born 10 September 1965) was the acting US Attorney for the Southern District of New York serving in the position from December 2008 until August 2009.

Sources
Cleary Gottlieb Steen and Hamilton bio

Living people
Cornell University alumni
New York University School of Law alumni
United States Attorneys for the Southern District of New York
Columbia Law School faculty
Place of birth missing (living people)
1965 births
People associated with Cleary Gottlieb Steen & Hamilton